"Rollin' with the Flow" is a song first released by American country music artist T.G. Sheppard, in 1974 on the B-side of a single and in 1975 on his debut album T.G. Sheppard. It is better known for a version released by Charlie Rich in 1977. The Rich single was his eighth Number One on the U.S. Billboard Hot Country Singles charts. "Rollin' with the Flow" also crossed over into the top-40 of the adult contemporary music charts and narrowly missed the Billboard Hot 100, peaking at number 101 on the Bubbling Under the Hot 100 chart. The song returned to the country music charts in 2008, with a version by Mark Chesnutt reaching number 25 on the Billboard  Hot Country Songs chart.

Content
The mid-tempo song is sung from the perspective of a man who, despite being at an age when most of his peers have started raising families (at least 30 years old according to the second line), still lives a hard-partying, rock-and-roll lifestyle more in tune with far younger men. The song also makes reference to his Christian faith, noting that he knows he cannot continue like this in heaven (thus why he does it while he is still alive) and that he will eventually be forgiven, not just by Jesus, but his "crazy friends" as well.

Charts

Weekly charts

Year-end charts

Mark Chesnutt version

In 2007, country music artist Mark Chesnutt recorded the song as the title track for an album. It was released on June 24, 2008. Chesnutt's version became his first Top 40 hit since "I'm a Saint" in late 2004-early 2005, peaking at number 25.

Chart performance

Kurt Vile version 
American indie rock artist Kurt Vile covered the song on his 2018 album, Bottle It In.

References

1977 singles
2007 singles
T. G. Sheppard songs
Charlie Rich songs
Mark Chesnutt songs
Song recordings produced by Billy Sherrill
Epic Records singles
Lofton Creek Records singles
Songs written by Jerry Hayes (songwriter)
1974 songs